On 18 December 2022, the Pakistani Taliban carried out an attack on a counterterrorism centre in the Bannu District, Khyber Pakhtunkhwa. They took the officers hostage until 20 December, when Pakistan's security forces lay siege to the centre, releasing all the hostages and killing 25 militants inside. Two officers were killed during the siege.

Background

An Islamist insurgency began in 2004 in the Federally Administered Tribal Areas and North-West Frontier Province, which are now Khyber Pakhtunkhwa. Bannu was bombed in 2014 and 2018.

Initial attack

Escape and takeover
On 18 December 2022, terrorists incarcerated at a Counter Terrorism Department facility in Bannu Cantt, Pakistan managed to escape their cells and held security personnel hostage for over 48 hours.

A policeman and a soldier were injured when the extremists "took over the premises," according to an official source. According to the Provincial government spokesperson the militant demanding the safe passage to Afghanistan via helicopter

They took all the workers of the centre as hostages.

Perpetrators 
The Pakistani Taliban claimed responsibility for the attack.

Reaction 
During the press briefing US State Department Spokesperson Ned Price, while responding to a question regarding the Bannu situation offers 'assistance' to Pakistan and says Government of Pakistan is a partner when it comes to these shared challenges, including the challenge of terrorist groups inside of Afghanistan.

Siege

Outcome
On 20 December at 12:30 pm, the Special Service Group launched an operation in which all the terrorists were killed and hostages were freed. The CTD compound was cleared by 2:30 p.m.

See also
2014 Bannu bombing
2018 Mastung and Bannu bombings

References

2022 murders in Pakistan
Attacks in Pakistan in 2022
December 2022 crimes in Asia
December 2022 events in Pakistan
Terrorist incidents in Pakistan in 2022
Deaths by firearm in Pakistan
Hostage taking in Pakistan
Operations involving Pakistani special forces
Tehrik-i-Taliban Pakistan attacks
Insurgency in Khyber Pakhtunkhwa
Bannu District